Mac Quayle is an American composer for film, television and video games, best known for his work on the USA Network's Mr. Robot and for FX's American Horror Story.

Quayle was born in Suffolk, Virginia, but moved around the state, living in Richmond, Norfolk and Chesapeake. He attended Matthew Fontaine Maury High School, and graduated from Western Branch High School. Quayle first discovered music at age 6 when he was part of his church's choir, and would take piano and percussion lessons. During school, he served as a band member for two different bands: The Naros and The X-Raves.

Quayle moved to New York City to attend New York University, but departed when his internship at a studio allowed him to make a living working as a keyboard player and programmer. In 2004, he moved to Los Angeles, where he worked as an additional composer for the CBS crime drama Cold Case. He was introduced to film composer Cliff Martinez, and would work under him on films such as The Lincoln Lawyer, Drive and Contagion. His work was noticed by Ryan Murphy when Quayle and Martinez worked on his television film The Normal Heart, and invited him to audition to be the composer for the fourth season of American Horror Story. He was hired the day after his audition. Quayle would also compose the score for Murphy's programs Scream Queens, American Crime Story, Feud, 9-1-1, Pose, The Politician, 9-1-1: Lone Star, and Ratched.

For his work on the first season of Mr. Robot, Quayle was awarded the Primetime Emmy Award for Outstanding Music Composition for a Series. He would also be nominated for his work on American Horror Story and Feud.

Filmography

Television

Film

Video games

References

External links
Mac Quayle at the Internet Movie Database

American composers
American television composers
Living people
Musicians from Norfolk, Virginia
People from Chesapeake, Virginia
People from Norfolk, Virginia
People from Richmond, Virginia
People from Suffolk, Virginia
Primetime Emmy Award winners
Year of birth missing (living people)